Bet, Beth, Beh, or Vet is the second letter of the Semitic abjads, including Phoenician Bēt , Hebrew Bēt , Aramaic Bēth  , Syriac Bēṯ , and Arabic  . Its sound value is the voiced bilabial stop ⟨b⟩ or the voiced labiodental fricative ⟨v⟩.

The letter's name means "house" in various Semitic languages (Arabic bayt, Akkadian bītu, bētu, Hebrew: bayiṯ, Phoenician bt etc.; ultimately all from Proto-Semitic *bayt-), and appears to derive from an Egyptian hieroglyph of a house by acrophony. 
O1

The Phoenician letter gave rise to, among others, the Greek beta (Β, β), Latin B (B, b) and Cyrillic Be (Б, б) and Ve (В, в).

Origin
The name bet is derived from the West Semitic word for "house" (as in Hebrew bayt בַּיִת), and the shape of the letter derives from a Proto-Sinaitic glyph that may have been based on the Egyptian hieroglyph Pr  O1  which depicts a house.

Arabic  
The Arabic letter  is named  . It is written in several ways depending on its position in the word:

For , it may be used interchangeably with the Persian letter  - pe (with 3 dots) in this case.

Hebrew Bet / Vet

Hebrew spelling: 

The Hebrew letter represents two different phonemes: a "b" sound (bet) and a "v" sound (vet). In modern Hebrew, the more commonly used Ktiv hasar niqqud spelling, which does not use diacritics, does not visually distinguish between the two phonemes.

This letter is named bet and vet, following the modern Israeli Hebrew pronunciation, bet and vet, in Israel and by most Jews familiar with Hebrew, although some non-Israeli Ashkenazi speakers pronounce it beis (or bais) and veis (or vais or vaiz). It is also named beth, following the Tiberian Hebrew pronunciation, in academic circles.

In modern Hebrew the frequency of the usage of bet, out of all the letters, is 4.98%.

Variations on written form/pronunciation

Bet with the dagesh
There are various rules in Hebrew grammar that stipulate when and why a dagesh is used.

Bet without the dagesh (Vet)
In Ktiv menuqad spelling, which uses diacritics, when the letter appears as  without the dagesh ("dot") in its center it represents a voiced labiodental fricative: . In Ktiv hasar niqqud spelling, without diacritics, the letter without the dot may represent either phoneme.

Mystical significance of 
Bet in gematria represents the number 2.

As a prefix, the letter bet may function as a preposition meaning "in", "at", or "with".

Bet is the first letter of the Torah. As Bet is the number 2 in gematria, this is said to symbolize that there are two parts to Torah: the Written Torah and the Oral Torah. According to Jewish legend, the letter Bet was specially chosen among the 22 letters in Hebrew by God as the first letter of Torah as it begins with "Bereshit (In the beginning) God created heaven and earth."

Genesis Rabbah points out that the letter is closed on three sides and open on one; this is indicate that one can investigate what happened after creation, but not what happened before it, or what is above the heavens or below the earth.

In mathematics
In set theory, the beth numbers stand for powers of infinite sets.

Syriac Beth

In the Syriac alphabet, the second letter is  — Beth. It is one of six letters that represents two associated sounds (the others are Gimel, Dalet, Kaph, Pe and Taw). When Beth has a hard pronunciation (qûššāyâ) it is a [b]. When Beth has a soft pronunciation (rûkkāḵâ) it is traditionally pronounced as a [v], similar to its Hebrew form. However, in eastern dialects, the soft Beth is more often pronounced as a [w], and can form diphthongs with its preceding vowel. Whether Beth should be pronounced as a hard or soft sound is generally determined by its context within a word. However, wherever it is traditionally geminate within a word, even in dialects that no longer distinguish double consonants, it is hard. In the West Syriac dialect, some speakers always pronounce Beth with its hard sound.

Beth, when attached to the beginning of a word, represents the preposition 'in, with, at'. As a numeral, the letter represents the number 2, and, using various systems of dashes above or below, can stand for 2,000 and 20,000.

Character encodings

See also
 Bayt (disambiguation)Bayt/Beit/Beth/Bet (disambiguation), meaning 'house' in various Semitic languages; part of many place-names

References

External links

Phoenician alphabet
Arabic letters
Hebrew letters
﷽